Gusarov is a Russian masculine surname, its feminine counterpart is Gusarova. It may refer to
Alexei Gusarov (born 1964), Russian ice hockey defender
Gennadi Gusarov (1937–2014), Russian football player
Nikolai Gusarov (1905–1985), Soviet statesman
Nikolay Mikhailovich Gusarov (1917–1979), Soviet military officer

Russian-language surnames